National Freedom Fighter Council or Jatiya Muktijoddha Council is an autonomous Bangladesh government council responsible for the welfare of "Freedom Fighters" (Mukti Bahini) and maintaining a list of the Freedom Fighters and is located in Magbazar, Dhaka, Bangladesh.

History
The council was formed to look after the welfare of Mukti Bahini members, who fought for Bangladesh in the Bangladesh Liberation War in 1971, under the Ministry of Liberation War Affairs. The council also regulates the usages of the term Bangladesh Liberation War to prevent exploitation. In 2015 the council decided to give Birangonas, women who were raped in the Bangladesh Liberation war, the status of freedom fighters including the associated benefits.

On 23 January 2017 Bangladesh High Court asked the government to explain why asking the council to investigate and removed "fake freedom fighters" is not illegal under the  Jatiya Muktijoddha Council Act, 2002. The government formed local investigative units for this purpose on 12 January 2017.

References

Government agencies of Bangladesh
Organisations based in Dhaka
Bangladesh Liberation War
Mukti Bahini